The 1969 African Cup of Champions Clubs Final was the final of the 1969 African Cup of Champions Clubs.

It was a football tie held over two legs in December 1969 and January 1970 between TP Englebert of Democratic Republic of the Congo, and Ismaily  of United Arab Republic.

Ismaily won the final with aggregate 5–3, became the 1st Egyptian club to win the cup.

Road to the final

Match details

First leg

Second leg

Notes and references

External links
 

1969
1
TP Mazembe matches
Ismaily SC matches
International club association football competitions hosted by the Democratic Republic of the Congo